National Route 421 is a national highway of Japan connecting Kuwana, Mie and Ōmihachiman, Shiga in Japan, with a total length of 72 km (44.74 mi).

References

National highways in Japan
Roads in Mie Prefecture
Roads in Shiga Prefecture